Aleksi Mäkelä (born 8 February 1995) is a Finnish professional ice hockey defenceman. He is currently an unrestricted free agent and has played in the top ranked Liiga. Mäkelä was selected by the Dallas Stars in the seventh round, 182nd overall, of the 2013 NHL Entry Draft.

Playing career
Mäkelä made his SM-liiga debut playing with Ilves during the 2012–13 SM-liiga season.

Following two full seasons in the Liiga with Ässät, Mäkelä left as a free agent to secure a one-year contract with second division Mestis club, Lempäälän Kisa, on August 14, 2018.

Career statistics

Regular season and playoffs

International

References

External links

1995 births
Living people
Ässät players
Dallas Stars draft picks
Finnish ice hockey defencemen
Ilves players
Lempäälän Kisa players
Ice hockey people from Tampere